Červená Voda is a municipality and village in Ústí nad Orlicí District in the Pardubice Region of the Czech Republic. It has about 2,900 inhabitants.

Administrative parts
Villages of Bílá Voda, Dolní Orlice, Horní Orlice, Mlýnice, Mlýnický Dvůr, Moravský Karlov and Šanov are administrative parts of Červená Voda.

Etymology
The name literally means "red water". Its name derives from limonite contained in the local stream basin, which sometimes coloured it to brown or red. According to local legend, it was named after the bloodshed during the Hussite Wars, when the stream was coloured with blood.

Geography
Villages of Dolní Orlice and Horní Orlice are located in Bohemia, the rest of the municipal territory lies in Moravia.

Červená Voda is a long village, stretching along the banks of the Červenovodský Stream, which contributes the river Březná. The village is situated in the Kłodzko Valley between the mountain ranges of the Orlické Mountains and the Hanušovice Highlands, in which the municipal territory also significantly extends. The municipality is located on the European water divide between three seas: the Baltic Sea, the North Sea and the Black Sea. The river Tichá Orlice, which flows into the Elbe, originates in Horní Orlice village.

History

The first written mention of Červená Voda is from 1481, under its original name Malé Heroltice. The area of today's Červená Voda belonged to estates of Šilperk (later Štíty), Ruda nad Moravou and Králíky. Šanov was first mentioned in 1556. In 1562, Georg Schürer founded here the first glassworks.

As part of the Štíty estate, Červená Voda was owned by Pavel Kathar of Kathar, who sold it to the Odkolkové of Újezdec family in 1602. The first written mention of Bílá Voda is from 1596, when it was together with Mlýnice as parts of the Ruda nad Moravou estate acquired by the Zierotin family. During the rule of Zierotins, the estate experienced boom and its price has risen markedly. After the Battle of White Mountain, Ladislav Velen lost all his manors.

Consequently, Karl Eusebius gained power over the Štíty estate in 1624 and united it with the estate of Ruda nad Moravou. The prosperity of estates ended with Thirty Years' War. Červená Voda was damaged and looted several times.

In 1847, the village gained the right to hold markets, but never had the status of a market town.

In implication of the Revolution of 1848 came the fall of the patrimonial regime. The land reform of 1850 made Červená Voda part of the political district of Hohenstadt. Did most of the villagers made a living from agriculture till than, the second part of the 19th century was molded by the commencing industrialization, foremost by textile fabrication in 1850. In 1865 Červená Voda was connected to the state's road network. By 1866 Prussian troops once more passed through the village without causing greater damages.

With the opening of a branch line from Králíky to Štíty, Červená Voda was connected to the railway network in 1899 and concurrently experienced its economical and social heyday. After the World War I Moravia and thus Rothwasser/Červená Voda became part of the newly formed First Czechoslovak Republic.

Modern history
After the Munich Agreement in 1938, Červená Voda was occupied by the Nazi's Wehrmacht. Červená Voda was incorporated into the newly formed province of Sudetenland. Thus Czechoslovakia had lost all her heavily fortified borderlands, leaving her indefensible. The Czech population left Červená Voda and went inland.

In 1944, Germany opened here a sub camp of the concentration camp Gross-Rosen. About 650 Jewish women from Hungary, Poland, France and Romania was sent there from Auschwitz concentration camp.

After the war, the German-speaking population was expelled per the Beneš decrees in 1946. The village was partly resettled by Czech people from surrounding villages.

In 1949, Šanov and Červená Voda municipalities were merged. By the administrative reform in 1960, Červená Voda was greatly enlarged by affiliating the surrounding villages. In 1973, Horní Boříkovice separated and joined Králíky.

Transport
The railway leads across the municipality. There are six stations and stops: Moravský Karlov, Červená Voda, Červená Voda-Pod rozhlednou, Dolní Orlice, Bílá Voda and Mlýnický Dvůr. Two lines are served, from Ústí nad Orlicí to Moravský Karlov and from Dolní Lipka to Moravský Karlov.

Through the municipality passes state road 11, which has a junction with state road 43 leading to Králíky inside the municipality.

Sport
There is a small ski resort in Mlýnický Dvůr part of Červená Voda.

Sights
The most notable building in Červená Voda is the Church of Saint Matthias. It was built in 1686. There is also the Church of the Nativity of the Virgin Mary in Mlýnický Dvůr from 1575, and the Church of Saint Joseph Calasanz in Moravský Karlov from 1792.

In 2006, an observation tower was inaugurated on Křížová mountain.

Notable people
Manfred Buder (1936–2021), German ice hockey player

References

External links

Ski Resort in Červená Voda

Villages in Ústí nad Orlicí District